Finlay Alexander Macnab (born 27 December 2000) is an English professional footballer who last played as a midfielder for AFC Wimbledon.

His parents are Geoffrey Charles Macnab and Catriona Campbell. His paternal grandfather was James Charles Macnab of Macnab, 23rd Chief of Clan Macnab.

Career
Macnab began his career in the youth system at Brentford, before signing his first professional contract with AFC Wimbledon after impressing during a trial period at the club. That same day he joined Leatherhead on loan. On 13 November 2019, Macnab made his debut for the club in a 3–1 EFL Trophy loss against Southend United. He was released at the end of the season following the expiration of his contract. In October 2021, he spoke to BBC News about how he had been kept out of the game for more than a year because of suffering from long covid.

Career statistics

References

2000 births
Living people
Association football midfielders
English footballers
AFC Wimbledon players
Leatherhead F.C. players